The San Angelo Pirates were a class-D minor league baseball, club based in San Angelo, Texas. The team first played in 1958 and partially during the following season. On June 9, 1959, the Pirates moved to Roswell, New Mexico to become the Roswell Pirates. In 1959, the San Angelo/Roswell Pirates was the first professional team to feature Willie Stargell, who was elected to the Hall of Fame in 1988. Stargell hit .274 with 7 homeruns and 87 RBI in 118 games with the team.

Season-by-season

† San Angelo moved to Roswell on June 9, 1959

Baseball teams established in 1958
Baseball teams disestablished in 1959
Defunct minor league baseball teams
Sports in San Angelo, Texas
Professional baseball teams in New Mexico
Roswell, New Mexico
Pittsburgh Pirates minor league affiliates
1958 establishments in Texas
1959 disestablishments in New Mexico
Defunct baseball teams in New Mexico